Bahiyyih is a given name. Notable people with the name include:

Bahíyyih Khánum (1846–1932), the daughter of Bahá'u'lláh, the founder of the Baháʼí Faith
Bahiyyih Nakhjavani (fl. 1962), a Persian writer born in Uganda, educated in the United Kingdom and the United States, living in France

Iranian feminine given names